Jacinto Rodríguez may refer to:
 Jacinto Rodríguez (footballer) (born 1958), Paraguayan footballer
 Jacinto Rodríguez Díaz (1901–1929), aviation pioneer in Guatemala
 Jacinto Rodriguez (1815–1880), recipient of the Rancho Jacinto Mexican land grant